Kumar Sangakkara is a retired Sri Lankan cricketer and a former captain of the Sri Lanka national cricket team. He is a left-handed top-order batsman and plays as the wicket-keeper in One Day International (ODI) format of the game. Described by the English cricket writer Peter Roebuck as "among the most polished and prudent of batsmen", Sangakkara has made centuries (100 or more runs in a single innings) on 38 and 25 occasions in Test and ODI matches respectively, as of 24 August 2015. He has at times been top of the International Cricket Council (ICC) rankings for Test batsmen. His awards include ODI Cricketer of the Year, captain of the ICC World XI Test team, and the 2011 ICC People's Choice Award (all at the 2011 ICC Awards), and being named one of the Wisden Cricketers of the Year in 2012.

Sangakkara made his Test debut against South Africa in July 2000. He scored his maiden Test century in 2001, against India, and his first double-century during the 2002 Asian Test Championship final against Pakistan. Sangakkara's highest score in Test cricket is 319, which he scored against Bangladesh in 2014. During his innings of 287 against South Africa in 2006, he and Mahela Jayawardene set a new world record of 624 runs for the highest partnership for any wicket in Test or first-class cricket. In the following year, he scored back-to-back double-centuries against Bangladesh, the fifth instance of successive double-centuries in Test cricket. He has scored 200 or more runs in a Test match on eleven occasions, surpassing Brian Lara, who has scored 200 or more runs in a Test match on nine occasions; only Donald Bradman (12 double-centuries) has done so more often. He became the ninth batsman and second Sri Lankan to score centuries against all Test-playing nations in December 2007, when he scored 152 against England. He was appointed captain of the Sri Lanka team in March 2009, following the resignation of Mahela Jayawardene, and the first of his seven Test centuries as captain came against Pakistan in July of the same year. Sangakkara has the second-highest batting average—69.60 per innings—for a captain who scored a minimum of 1,500 runs.

He made his ODI debut in July 2000 against Pakistan, and his first century in this format was against the same team during the 2003 Cherry Blossom Sharjah Cup. The start of his ODI career was "fairly ordinary", according to one cricket journalist, as he only scored two centuries in four years. His highest score of 169 was made at the R. Premadasa Stadium, Colombo, against South Africa, during South African cricket team in Sri Lanka in 2013. Sangakkara's only ODI century as captain was scored against New Zealand in a group stage match in the 2011 ICC World Cup. In the sixth match of the 2011–12 Commonwealth Bank Series, Sangakkara became the fastest Sri Lankan cricketer, and third in all, to reach 10,000 ODI runs. He played 56 Twenty20 International matches (T20Is) between 2006 and 2014; his highest score in the format is 78.

Key

Test cricket centuries

One Day International cricket centuries

Notes

References

General

Specific

External links 
 Player profile of Sangakkara at ESPNcricinfo
 Interview with Sangakkara

Lists of international cricket centuries by player
Sri Lankan cricket lists